Nahan's partridge (Ptilopachus nahani), also known as the Nahan's francolin, is a bird traditionally placed in the family Phasianidae. As suggested by its alternative name, it was formerly believed to be a francolin and placed either in Francolinus or Pternistis, but it is now known that its closest relative is the stone partridge and together may in fact be the only African representatives of the New World quails (Odontophoridae).

Description

Distribution and habitat
This endangered species is found in the rainforests in northeastern DR Congo and western Uganda, and it is threatened by habitat loss and hunting.

References 

Nahan's partridge
Birds of East Africa
Birds of Central Africa
Nahan's partridge
Taxonomy articles created by Polbot